Chang Shih (born 7 February 1966) is a Taiwanese actor. He won the Golden Horse Award for Best Supporting Actor in 1989.

Filmography

Film

TV series
The Emperor in Han Dynasty (2005)
The Lucky Stars (2005)
The Myth (2010)

External links

1966 births
Living people
Taiwanese male television actors
Taiwanese male film actors
20th-century Taiwanese male actors
21st-century Taiwanese male actors
Taiwanese film directors